Baudour Heliport  is a hospital heliport located near Douvrain, in the Walloon municipality of Saint-Ghislain, Hainaut, Belgium.

See also
 List of airports in Belgium

References

External links 
 Airport record for Baudour Heliport at Landings.com

Airports in Hainaut (province)